Nabil Bahoui (born 5 February 1991) is a Swedish professional footballer who used to play as a winger, but is now usually deployed as a forward.

Club career
On 8 November 2012, it was announced that Bahoui had signed a 3.5-year contract with AIK. He chose at first number 14. However, due to an agreement with fellow midfielder Lalawélé Atakora, who at the time was wearing number 11, he got to switch from 14 to 11.

International career 
On 26 August 2014, Nabil was picked out in the Swedish national team to play a friendly game against Estonia and he was also in the squad when Sweden played against Austria in the 2016 European Championship qualifiers.

Personal life
Bahoui's parents were born in Morocco. Bahoui goes by the Swedish-style nickname "Nabbe". In April 2020, he participated in the online FIFA 20 Stay and Play Cup, in which he finished a semifinalist, losing to the eventual winner, Mohamed Daramy. He defeated the representatives for PSV Eindhoven, Manchester City, and Olympique Lyon to reach that point, scoring 12 goals and conceding 5.

Career statistics

Honours 
AIK
 Allsvenskan: 2018

References

External links

EA Sports tournament page

Stats at aftonbladet.se

1991 births
Living people
Swedish people of Moroccan descent
Swedish footballers
Moroccan footballers
Sweden international footballers
Sweden youth international footballers
Swedish expatriate footballers
Swedish expatriate sportspeople in Saudi Arabia
Expatriate footballers in Saudi Arabia
Swedish expatriate sportspeople in Germany
Expatriate footballers in Germany
Swedish expatriate sportspeople in Switzerland
Expatriate footballers in Switzerland
Association football forwards
IF Brommapojkarna players
AFC Eskilstuna players
AIK Fotboll players
Al-Ahli Saudi FC players
Hamburger SV players
Hamburger SV II players
Grasshopper Club Zürich players
De Graafschap players
Allsvenskan players
Superettan players
Ettan Fotboll players
Saudi Professional League players
Bundesliga players
Regionalliga players
Swiss Super League players
Eredivisie players
Footballers from Stockholm